Michele Saee (born December 2, 1956) is a Los Angeles-based architect, designer and educator.

Early life and education 
Saee was born in Tehran, Iran. In 1981, he received his Master of Art in Architecture degree from the University of Florence Italy. In 1982, Saee received his post graduate degree in Technical Urban Planning at the Polytechnic of Milan. In 1985, Saee started his own architectural design office in Los Angeles.

Career 
Saee started his professional career working with the avant-garde architectural office of Superstudio (Natalini, Toraldo Di Francia, Magris and Frassinelli) in Florence and joined 
Morphosis (Mayne, Rotondi) when he moved to Los Angeles in 1983.

Saee taught environmental and architectural design at Otis Art Institute of Parsons School of Design in Los Angeles. In 1990, Saee began teaching at the Southern Southern California Institute of Architecture (SCI-Arc) and other schools in the U.S. and abroad. Saee exhibits and lectures on architecture in many countries around the world. Saee's exhibitions includes: "The Venice Architectural Biennial 2002, Italy", "Busan Biennial, Korea 2002", "Venice Architectural Biennial 2004", and "The First Architectural Biennial Beijing China 2004".

Saee started his design studio in 1985, since then he has designed more than 100 projects and more than half of them are built.

Teaching 

 University of southern California, USC, Los Angeles, California, Visiting Professor, 2012
 Southern California Institute of Architecture, Los Angeles, California, 1990–2007, Visiting Professor Spring 2009, 2010 Public Access Press Committee (founding group), 1994 WASC Accreditation Advisory Board, 1995
 Tecnologico De Monterrey, CADi Cuorso de Actualizacion en las Disciplinas, Guadalajara Mexico, June 2010
 UCLA, University of California Los Angeles, School of Architecture, Visiting Professor, 2001
 Cal Poly Pomona College of Environmental Design, Visiting Professor, 1998–99
 RWTH Aachen, Germany, Lehr-und Forschungsgebiet Architekturtheorie, Visiting professor, January 1999
 UCLA Extension, Santa Monica, California,1995–1998
 Otis Art Institute of Parsons School of Design, Los Angeles, California,1986–1990

Major projects 
Completed
 Bay Cities Appliances Showroom Beverly Hills, California, USA, 2011
 Hodjatie Residence, Pacific Palisades, California, USA, 2010
 Sky exhibition Pavilion, Beijing, China, 2007
 The Museum of Antiquity, 2006
 Template house, Beijing, China, 2005
 Publicis Drugstore, Paris, France, 2004
 Café Nescafe, Paris, France, 2004
 Linnie House, Venice, California, USA, 2004
 Cellular fantasy, Santa Monica, California, USA, 2003
 Beverly Hills Cosmetic Dental Clinic, Beverly Hills, California, 1992
 Pave Jewelry Store, Brentwood, California, 1991
 Sun House, Fullerton, California, 1990
 Ecru Clothing Store, Marina del Rey, California, 1989
 Angeli Mare, Marina del Rey, California, 1989
 Jones-Chapman Residence, Brentwood, California,
 Ecru Clothing Store, Phase II/Melrose, Los Angeles, California, 1988
 Design Express Furniture Store, Los Angeles, California, 1987
 Ecru Clothing Store, Los Angeles, California, 1987
 Trattoria Angeli, Los Angeles, California, 1986
 434 Apartment Complex, Los Angeles, California, 1986
 Tahiti Marina Apartments & Dock, Marina Del Rey, California, USA
 Glenroy Residence, Los Angeles, California, USA
 Qingdao Bridge, Qingdao, China
 Underwater World Xiamen, Xiamen, China

In Progress
 Sun Rise Apartments, Los Angeles, California, USA
 Sherman Way Apartments, Los Angeles, California, USA
 Lincoln mixed-used Commercial/Residential Unit Addition, Santa Monica, California, USA
 Robertson Commercial & Office, Los Angeles, California, USA
 Altshuler Residence, pacific palisades, California, USA
 Maple Apartments Rehabilitation, Beverly Hills, California, USA

Awards 
 City of Beverly Hills Architectural Design Award, 2011 Interarch,
 2009 Interior Design China, Hall of Fame Award, 2007 LA 12 Award, 2000,
 Interarch 2009, Special Prize of the Mayor of Strasbourg Silver medal
 Interior Design China, 2007, Hall of Fame Award.
 LA 12 Award, 2000.
 American Institute of Architects Design Award, 1997.
 American Institute of Architects, 1997, "next LA" Design Award.
 " Emerging Voices", 1997, selection by “The Architectural League of New York”
 "40 under 40", 1995, (the most promising American architects under the age of 40)
 "Young Architects Forum Design Award," 1987, The Architectural League of New York

References 
 http://arch.usc.edu/faculty/saee
 https://web.archive.org/web/20130118071517/http://www.sciarc.edu/portal/people/faculty/index.html
 https://archive.today/20130410194316/http://www.floornature.com/architects/biography/michele-saee-5637/
 https://www.nytimes.com/2004/03/14/travel/art-style-cross-borders-paris-new-treasures-versailles-le-drugstore-updated.html
 http://theater.nytimes.com/2007/01/13/theater/13glob.html?fta=y
 https://www.nytimes.com/2004/03/06/news/06iht-rshop_ed3_.html
 http://www.grahamfoundation.org/grantees/4880-a-new-sculpturalism-contemporary-architecture-in-southern-california
 http://beverlyhills.patch.com/articles/beverly-hills-architecture-awards

External links
 www.saeestudio.com Official Website
 http://www.architizer.com/en_us/firms/projects/saee-studio/24071/#.UR1ZgKU4vTo
 https://www.flickr.com/photos/saee_studio/sets

1956 births
Living people
People from Tehran
Iranian architects
UCLA School of the Arts and Architecture faculty
University of Florence alumni